Kadaparthy is a large village and Gram panchayat of Nakrekal mandal, Nalgonda district, in Telangana state. with total 729 families residing. The Kadaparthy village has population of 2680 of which 1300 are males while 1380 are females as per Population Census 2011.Five kilometers from national highway 9(Nakrekal). 

In Kadaparthy village population of children with age 0-6 is 272 which makes up 10.15 % of total population of village. Average Sex Ratio of Kadaparthy village is 1062 which is higher than Andhra Pradesh state average of 993. Child Sex Ratio for the Kadaparthy as per census is 889, lower than Andhra Pradesh average of 939. 

Kadaparthy village has lower literacy rate compared to Andhra Pradesh. In 2011, literacy rate of Kadaparthy village was 61.38 % compared to 67.02 % of Andhra Pradesh. In Kadaparthy Male literacy stands at 71.97 % while female literacy rate was 51.60 %. 

As per constitution of India and Panchyati Raaj Act, Kadaparthy village is administrated by Sarpanch (Head of Village) who is elected representative of village. 

Kadaparthy Data

Caste Factor 
Schedule Caste (SC) constitutes 21.16 % while Schedule Tribe (ST) were 0.11 % of total population in Kadaparthy village.

References

Villages in Nalgonda district